Cheshire West and Chester Council elections are held every four years. Cheshire West and Chester Council is the local authority for the unitary authority of Cheshire West and Chester in Cheshire, England. Since the last boundary changes in 2019, 70 councillors have been elected from 45 wards.

Political control
Cheshire West and Chester was created on 1 April 2009 replacing Chester, Ellesmere Port and Neston, Vale Royal and Cheshire County Council. The first election to the new council was held in 2008, initially operating as a shadow authority before coming into its powers on 1 April 2009. Political control of the council since 2009 has been held by the following parties:

Leadership
The leaders of the council since 2009 have been:

Council elections
2008 Cheshire West and Chester Council election
2011 Cheshire West and Chester Council election (new ward boundaries)
2015 Cheshire West and Chester Council election
2019 Cheshire West and Chester Council election (new ward boundaries)

By-election results

2011

2014

2017

2018

References

 
Cheshire West and Chester
Unitary authority elections in England
Council elections in Cheshire